The 2019–20 DPR Korea Premier Football League is the third season of the reformed DPR Korea Premier Football League, the top North Korean association football league, to use a home-and-away format. The league started on 5 December 2019. The season was expected to finish in October 2020, however, due to COVID-19 prevention measures, league games did not resume after the winter break. It is not known whether the season was cancelled or postponed.

April 25 are the defending champions.

Teams
Kalmaegi were relegated from the previous season. No teams were promoted, so a total of 12 teams participate:

League table
Note: The following table is compiled from known results reported in the news media, and may not align with the official table.

References

See also
2020 Hwaebul Cup

External links
DPRK Premier Football League 
DPR Korea Football
North Korea 2019/20, RSSSF.com

DPR Korea Football League seasons
1
1
Korea, North
DPR Korea Premier Football League, 2019-20